Captain Michalis is a 1953 novel by the Greek writer Nikos Kazantzakis. In the English, German, and French translations (as well as many others) it is known as Freedom or Death. The writer was influenced by his early years on the island of Crete and uses explicit Cretan Greek words and the Cretan idiom in a way that preserves it untouched. It is one of the most widely read books of modern Greek literature which has been translated and published in several languages.

Plot

The book deals with the rebellion of the Cretans against the Ottoman Empire in 1889.

Explanation of the novel's title
It is thought that the book's title honours Kazantzakis' father Michalis Kazantzakis, by whom the writer was inspired. The word Captain is not used in its naval rank sense, but as the title of leader of a guerilla warfare group (the writer's father Michalis Kazantzakis was a leader of such a group, hence the title. Kazantzakis says this in his book "Report to Greco").

Freedom or Death was added as a subtitle to the second edition in Greek released by Difros publishers in Athens in 1955 and was the preferred English (US) title. In the UK the book was published as Freedom and Death, which were the last words in the book. The expression comes from the Greek national motto "Freedom or Death", derived from the Greek War of Independence and used by Cretan rebels such as the book's protagonist.  The "or" was knowingly replaced with "and" in the ending text by Kazantzakis.

Publication

Captain Michalis has been translated into many languages, including Turkish. 
 1954, Germany, (titled "Freiheit oder Tod", translated by Helmut von den Steinen), Herbig, Berlin.
 1955, Sweden, (titled "Frihet eller död", translated into Swedish by Börje Knös), Ljus, Stockholm.
 1955, Norway, (titled "Frihet eller død", translated into Norwegian by Leif Kristiansen), Tanum, Oslo.
 1955, Denmark, (titled "Frihed eller død", translated into Danish by Karl Hornelund), Jespersen og Pio, Copenhagen.
 1955, Netherlands, (titled "Kapitein Michalis", translated into Dutch by H.C.M. Edelman), De Fontein, Utrecht.
 1955, Finland (titled "Vapaus tai Kuolema" translated into Finnish by Elvi Sinervo), Kustannusosakeyhtiö Tammi, Helsinki.
 1955, United States, (titled "Freedom or Death, a novel", translated by Jonathan Griffin),  Simon and Schuster, New York.
 1956, Great Britain (titled "Freedom and Death, a novel", translated by Jonathan Griffin), Bruno Cassirer, Oxford .
 1956, France (titled "La Liberté ou La Mort", translated by Gisèle Prassinos and Pierre Fridas),  Plon, Paris.
 1956, Yugoslavia (titled "Kapitan Mihalis", translated into Slovenian by Jose Udović), : Cankarjevna, Ljubljana.
 1957, Iceland (titled "Frelsið eða dauðann", translated into Icelandic by Skúli Bjarkan), Almenna bókafélagið, Reykjavík.
 1957, Argentina (titled "Libertad o muerte", translated into Spanish by Rosa Chacel), Carlos Lohlé, Buenos Aires.
 1958, Portugal (titled "Liberdade ou morte", translated into Portuguese by Maria Franco), Cor, Lisbon.
 1958, Hungary (titled "Mihálisz kapitány", translated into Hungarian by Abody Béla), Európa, Budapest.
 1959, Italy (titled "Capitan Michele", translated by Edvige Levi Gunalachi), Martello, Milan.
 1960, Poland (titled "Kapitan Michał", translated into Polish by Katarzyna Witwicka), Czytelnik, Warsaw.
 1960, Czechoslovakia (titled "Kapitán Michalis" translated into Czech by František Štuřík and Mariana Stříbrná),  Československý spisovatel, Prague.
 1961, Bulgaria (titled "Kapitan Mikhalis", translated into Bulgarian by Georgi Kufov), Narodna Kultura, Sofia.
 1963, Israel (titled "Herut O Mavet" - "חרות או מוות"),  Am Oved, Tel Aviv .
 1965, USSR (titled "Kapitan Mihalis: Svoboda abo smert", translated into Ukrainian by Ivan Hrechanivs'ky, Viktoriia and Iannis Mochos), Vydavnytstvo Khudozhn'oi Literatury "Dnipro", Kiev.
 1967, Turkey, (titled "Ya hürriyet ya ölüm (Kapetan Mihalis)", translated by Nevzat Hatko), Ararat, Istanbul.
 1973, Iran, (titled "Azadi ya marg", translated into Persian by Muhammad Qazi), Khvarazmi, Tehran.
 1973, Albania (titled, "Ja vdekje, ja liri", translated into Albanian by Enver Fico),  Shtepia Botuese "Naim Frasheri" Tirana.
 1976, Egypt, (titled "al-Hurriya wa-l-maut"), al-Hay'a, Cairo.
 1982, China, (titled "Zi you huo si wang", translated into Chinese by Wang Zhenji yi),  Wai guo wen xue chu ban she, Peking.
 2002, Lithuania (titled "Kapitonas Michalis", translated into Lithuanian by Diana Bučiūtė), Vilnius.
 2013, Brazil (titled "O Capitão Michális (Liberdade ou Morte)", translated into Portuguese by Silvia Ricardino), Grua, São Paulo.
 2014, Croatia (titled "Sloboda ili smrt", translated into Croatian by Irena Gavranović Lukšić), Sandorf, Zagreb.
 2021, Russia (titled "Капитан Михалис", translated into Russian by Victor Grigorievich Sokoluk''), Wyrgorod, Moscow.

External links
Poetry Magazine article
Review by the Kazantzakis Museum
Lawrence Durrell's take on Freedom or Death

Greek novels
Greek literature
Modern Greek literature
1953 novels
Michalis
Fiction set in 1889
Novels by Nikos Kazantzakis
Novels set in the 1880s
Novels set in Crete
Novels set in the Ottoman Empire
Novels about rebels